Konstantin Sergeyevich Lopushansky (born June 12, 1947) is a Soviet and Russian film director, film theorist and author. He is best known for directing the apocalyptic and post-apocalyptic films Dead Man's Letters (1986), A Visitor to a Museum (1989), Russian Symphony (1994), and The Ugly Swans (2006).

In 1997, Lopushansky was awarded the Honored Artist of the Russian Federation honorary title. In 2007, he was awarded the People's Artist of Russia honorary title, the highest Russian civilian honor for performing arts.

Biography

Early life
Konstantin Lopushansky was born on June 12, 1947, in Dnepropetrovsk, Ukrainian SSR. His mother was Sofia Petrovna Lopushanskaya, who worked as a linguistic professor at Volgograd State University. His father was Sergei Timofeyevich Lopushansky, a front-line soldier who died in 1953 from wounds he sustained in war.

Education and early career
In 1970, Konstantin Lopushansky graduated from Kazan Conservatory as a violinist, and in 1973 he completed a postgraduate course at Leningrad Conservatory with a Ph.D. thesis in art criticism. Afterwards, Lopushansky taught at the Kazan and Leningrad conservatories for several years. Lopushansky took higher courses for scriptwriters and film directors from the director's department at the workshop of Emil Loteanu.

Upon graduating from the directorial courses in 1979, Lopushansky assisted Andrei Tarkovsky in directing the legendary film Stalker, based on the novel Roadside Picnic by Boris Strugatsky.

Lopushansky's thesis film Solo made in 1980 was about a musician playing his last concert during the Siege of Leningrad.

Since 1980 Lopushansky has worked as a production director at the Lenfilm cinema studio.

Dead Man's Letters and breakthrough
In 1986, Konstantin Lopushansky made his feature film directorial debut with the post-apocalyptic film Dead Man's Letters, which was co-written by Boris Strugatsky. It was screened at the International Critics' Week section of the Cannes Film Festival in 1987 and received the FIPRESCI prize at the 35th International Filmfestival Mannheim-Heidelberg.

Lopushanksy's 1989 film A Visitor to a Museum was entered into the 16th Moscow International Film Festival where it won the Silver St. George and the Prix of Ecumenical Jury.

Lopushansky's 1994 film Russian Symphony was screened in the Forum section of the 45th Berlin International Film Festival where it received the Prize of the Ecumenical Jury.

Lopushansky made the 2006 film The Ugly Swans, based on the novel by Arkady and Boris Strugatsky. The science-fiction film was about a writer who visits a boarding school for gifted children where the teachers are mutants.

Lopushansky's 2013 drama film The Role told the story of an actor who decides to impersonate a deceased commander of the Red Army. It was shown in competition at the 35th Moscow International Film Festival. It received the Nika Award for Best Screenplay.

Konstantin Lopushansky's drama film Through the Black Glass was released in 2019.

Filmography

References

External links
 

Film people from Dnipro
Russian film directors
Ukrainian film directors
1947 births
Living people
Russian people of Ukrainian descent
Academicians of the National Academy of Motion Picture Arts and Sciences of Russia